Llanbradach is a village within the historic boundaries of Glamorgan, South Wales less than  north of the town of Caerphilly. It is part of the community of Llanbradach and Pwll-y-Pant.

It is mostly residential, and contains three pubs, a primary school, a small local shopping area, a recreation ground, a library, two doctor's surgeries, and a youth centre. Being a traditional long and narrow South Wales Valleys village, its potential for expansion is restricted by the river on its eastern side and the hillside to the west.

The village is served by Llanbradach railway station on the former Rhymney Railway line. The village is twinned with the village of Ploubezre in Brittany

Naming
Ordinarily, "Llan" means church or parish, but in this case the origin of the name may come from "Nant Bradach", which means "the banks of river Bradach" ("Bradach" is an Irish word meaning robbing or pilfering). Alternatively, the Welsh word "brad" (treachery or deceit) could have been coupled with the Irish "-ach" suffix (stream or river), creating "a treacherous stream" – possibly one that is prone to sudden, destructive floods. The name is thought to have come into being from around 1597. It is usually taken to be a hybrid Welsh and Irish Name, Nant-Bradach as above, which would indicate a period long before 1597 (when the Llanbradach Fawr farm and house is mentioned), when the Irish ravaged the Glamorgan coast and the Holms, leaving names around (Rheliw'r Gwyddyl). The flood happened because they built on a floodplain.

History

Coal industry
Llanbradach Colliery was opened in the 1890s, and reached peak production in the 1930s, but was shut down in 1961. A number of old mine buildings are still visible to the rear of the village.

Llanbradach Viaduct
The Barry Railway opened its main line from Cadoxton South to Trehafod in the Rhondda valley by 1888 but such was the demand for coal for shipment from Barry docks that they constructed another branch (the Penrhos branch) from Tynycaeau to join the Rhymney Railway at Penrhos, west of Caerphilly and it was opened on 1 August 1901.  Demand for coal export increased still further and so the Barry Railway constructed an extension to run from a new Penrhos Lower Junction to join the Brecon & Merthyr Railway at Barry Junction (later Duffryn Isaf Junction) opposite Llanbradach and that opened on 2 January 1905. That extension circumvented the south-west of Caerphilly, and crossed the Rhymney Valley by means of the very impressive Llanbradach or Pwll-y-pant viaduct. The construction of this viaduct, north of Energlyn, was thus crucial to the establishment of the busy coal port at Barry, which dealt with nearly 4000 ships a year at its peak. That viaduct's length is the subject of conflicting data from various sources, one figure being 800 yards but the former GWR's assets diagrams do not agree with this but they do confirm that it comprised 16 spans of latticed 'N'-girders, 10 spanning just over 162 feet each and 5 of 36 feet, the remaining span distance not clear.

That extension was short-lived however, and due to the railway grouping of 1922, being a duplicated route to the Rhymney valley, succumbed to closure on 4 August 1926 and was decommissioned. It was removed to be sold for scrap by 1938.  The Penrhos and Penyrheol viaducts within the extension were removed by 1937. The brick support piers of the Llanbradach viaduct were demolished by explosives and their remains left as unsightly heaps across the valley for many decades but ultimately were removed with the general modernisation of the highways in the area. All that remains of the Pwll-y-pant viaduct is a single brick arch towards the western end of where the viaduct had run. A short part of the trackbed can still be seen near Energlyn. The rest of the trackbed was incorporated into the A468 Caerphilly bypass road, south-west of Caerphilly. The line carried on southwards from Penrhos through Ty Rhiw, and on to the Walnut Tree Viaduct, of similar construction, which itself was largely dismantled in 1969. As stated above, it  was originally built, along with the Garth tunnel, for the Barry Railway's Penrhos Branch from a junction at Tynycaeau on the Cadoxton to Trehafod line, and the viaduct eased the uphill incline for empty coal wagon traffic between Tynycaeau Junction, the Taff Valley and Caerphilly but loaded down coal trains had to be partially braked, manually, over parts of the descent from Penrhos to Barry. There were no formal passenger stations along this stretch but it did see some summer passenger excursion traffic to Barry Island in steam days as late as 1961 and such ran from Tredegar and Nantybwch (Sirhowi valley).

When the route closed in 1963 following the destruction of Tynycaeau signal box by fire in March of that year, the section from Walnut Tree West at Steetley Doloma's smelter, meant a stay of execution for the line as far as Penrhos Junction and just one track of the double track branch was worked as a 'long siding'. All that remains of the Walnut Tree viaduct are an abutment, an angled pillar and the Taff Bank pier. The latter structure was used in 1977 for the display of messages of goodwill for the Silver Jubilee of Queen Elizabeth. Most of the remaining trackbed north of Walnut Tree Taffs Well is now incorporated into the Taff Trail.
The remaining Cadoxton to Jct-Trehafod Jct (latterly Trefforest Jct) route, former Barry Railway's main line, also closed as a result of the Tynycaeau incident in 1963.

Workmen's Welfare Hall and Institute
The original Llanbradach Workmen's Institute, was a Miners' institute built in the 1900s, was constructed of timber and corrugated iron, and previously fulfilled the functions of village hall, school and a place for religious gatherings. A committee was set up in 1910 to organise the replacement of the old structure with a modern stone building. The new building was opened in 1913, and among the amenities available to the workmen were a snooker room, a small cinema, and a reading room and library.

The hall remained in use certainly until the early 1980s (albeit in a declining state). It housed the village library, a billiards room, possibly a boxing gym and for theatrical productions by the local Coed-Y-Brain school. It was demolished at some point around the turn of the 21st Century and is now a car park.

Governance
At the most local level, Llanbradach elects eight community councillors to serve on Llanbradach & Pwll-y-pant Community Council.

Llanbradach was an electoral ward to Mid Glamorgan County Council from 1989 until the council's dissolution in 1996. It subsequently became a ward for Caerphilly County Borough Council, electing two county councillors.

Sports clubs

Football
Llanbradach AFC was founded in 1986. Previously the Senior team played in the South Wales Alliance leagues but the Senior team collapsed from 2015 to 2017. Meanwhile, the club that trains boys and girls from under 6 years of age and upwards maintained a high level of coaching for the young people of Llanbradach.

The Senior team have now reassembled in the summer of 2017 and are currently playing in the Taff-Ely and Rhymney Valley league Division one.

Other
Rugby union, netball, bowls, and hockey are other popular sports in the Llanbradach locality.

Llanbradach was used in 2011 as the filming site for Sky1's "Stella" for the funeral home scenes.

Notable residents
Rodger Gifford, former FA Premier League and FIFA football referee.
Neil Jones, founding member of Amen Corner (band)

References

External links
Llanbradach main street in c.1955
Memories of Llanbradach on the BBC
Llanbradach pit on Welsh Coal Mines website

Villages in Caerphilly County Borough
Wards of Caerphilly County Borough
Mid Glamorgan electoral wards